The 2021 Southern Conference men's basketball tournament was the postseason men's basketball tournament for the Southern Conference for the 2020–21 season. All tournament games were played at the Harrah's Cherokee Center in Asheville, North Carolina, from March 5 through 8, 2021. The winner of the tournament received the conference's automatic bid to the 2021 NCAA Division I men's basketball tournament.

Seeds
All ten teams in the Southern Conference were eligible to compete in the conference tournament. Teams were seeded by record within the conference, with a tiebreaker system to seed teams with identical conference records. The top six teams received first-round byes.

Schedule and results

Bracket

See also
2021 Southern Conference women's basketball tournament

References

Tournament
Southern Conference men's basketball tournament
Basketball competitions in Asheville, North Carolina
College sports tournaments in North Carolina
College basketball in North Carolina
Southern Conference men's basketball tournament
Southern Conference men's basketball tournament